Straight Shooter is the second studio album by the English hard rock supergroup Bad Company. The album was released on April 2, 1975, a month after the release of the album's first single, "Good Lovin' Gone Bad", and four months before the second single, "Feel Like Makin' Love" (see 1975 in music).

The album reached number 3 on both the UK Albums Chart and the US Billboard 200. It was certified gold (500,000 units sold) by the Recording Industry Association of America a month after its release. The album was remastered and re-released in 1994.

The track "Shooting Star" (written by lead singer Paul Rodgers) was lyrically inspired by the drug and alcohol-related deaths of guitarist Jimi Hendrix and other rock musicians.

Background
In June 1974, Bad Company released their self-titled debut album. Three months later, the band and recording engineer Ron Nevison recorded at least eight songs at Clearwell Castle in Gloucestershire, England. Sometime later Nevison mixed the songs for Straight Shooter at Air Studios in London. The sleeve for the album was designed by Hipgnosis, who also designed their debut album.

The first single from the album, "Good Lovin' Gone Bad", was released in March 1975 and reached No. 36 on the Billboard Hot 100. The album was released in April. The album's final single "Feel like Makin' Love" was released in August and reached No. 10 on the Hot 100.

Critical reception

Straight Shooter received different reviews from different music critics. Gautam Baksi's review of the album for Allmusic said that the album's popularity was attributed to the acoustic ballads "Shooting Star" and "Feel like Makin' Love", while the two songs written by Simon Kirke—"Anna" and "Weep No More"—as well as the album not having enough supporting songs and follow-up singles, were what made the album less successful than its predecessor. 

Robert Christgau felt that although Straight Shooter was better than its predecessor, it should not be labelled hard rock because Paul Rodgers did not have a strong voice, which is needed to be a rock singer. 

Ed Naha's feeling of the album, as stated in Rolling Stone magazine, was much more favourable than Christgau's. Naha thought that, with their second album, Bad Company was proving that they would not end up like Mott the Hoople, Free, or King Crimson—bands that Bad Company's members used to be part of. Naha also thought that Simon Kirke's "Anna" was as bad as it was when it was first recorded, but that "Weep No More" showed that he was progressing as a writer, while Boz Burrell was also making progress on the bass.

Track listing

Non-album tracks
 "Whisky Bottle" (Rodgers, Ralphs, Kirke, Burrell) – 3:45
Released as the b-side to the "Good Lovin' Gone Bad" single.

Personnel
Bad Company
Paul Rodgers – vocals, guitar, piano
Mick Ralphs – guitar, keyboards
Boz Burrell – bass
Simon Kirke – drums

Production
 Produced by Bad Company
 Mastered by George Marino

Charts

Weekly charts

Year-end charts

Certifications and sales

References

External links
 Lyrics of live cover of "Shooting Star" by Queen + Paul Rodgers from Live in Ukraine, from Queen official website
 Bad Company - Straight Shooter (1975) album review by Stephen Thomas Erlewine, credits & releases at AllMusic
 Bad Company - Straight Shooter (1975) album releases & credits at Discogs
 Bad Company - Straight Shooter (1975, Deluxe Edition, 2015 Remaster) album to be listened as stream on Spotify

1975 albums
Albums with cover art by Hipgnosis
Bad Company albums
Island Records albums
Swan Song Records albums